"Control" is a song by British drum and bass production duo Matrix & Futurebound. It was released on 29 December 2013. The song peaked at number seven on the UK Singles Chart, making it the duo's most commercially successful single to date. It was included on the duo's 2019 album Mystery Machine.

Music video
The official video for "Control" premiered on 7 November 2013 through UKF Drum & Bass, at a total length of 3 minutes and 48 seconds.

Track listing

Chart performance

Weekly charts

Certifications

Release history

References

2013 singles
2013 songs
Matrix & Futurebound songs
Songs written by Tom Cane